Limunsudan Falls is a two-tiered waterfall located in Sitio Limunsudan, Barangay Rogongon,  from Iligan city-proper in the Philippines. It is said to be the Philippines' second highest waterfall, second only to Aliwagwag Falls in Cateel, Davao Oriental.

Areas surrounding the falls have been occupied by immigrants from Kalamlamahan of Barangay Rogongon of Iligan City since 1995, together with natives of the hegaonon tribes from the nearby barangays or sitios.

The current and flow of the water is gradually decreasing due to the operations of logging concessionaires in the area since in the 1950s, as well as those of illegal loggers.

References

External links
Finding Limunsudan Falls

Waterfalls of the Philippines